Upper Morehead, also known as Wára, is a Papuan language of New Guinea. Varieties are Wára (Vara), Kómnjo (Rouku), Anta, and Wèré (Wärä); these are divergent enough to sometimes be listed as distinct languages.

References

Tonda languages
Languages of Western Province (Papua New Guinea)